Joseph Edward Genewich (January 15, 1897 – December 21, 1985) was a pitcher in Major League Baseball. He played for the Boston Braves and New York Giants from 1922 to 1930. His key pitch was the slow curve.

References

External links

1897 births
1985 deaths
Major League Baseball pitchers
Boston Braves players
New York Giants (NL) players
Minneapolis Millers (baseball) players
Montreal Royals players
Baseball players from New York (state)
Sportspeople from Elmira, New York